Barronett is an unincorporated census-designated place located in the town of Lakeland, Barron County, Wisconsin, United States. Barronett has a post office with ZIP code 54813. As of the 2010 census, its population is 111.

History
Barronett was originally called Foster City, and under the latter name was platted in 1880. The name of the community was soon changed to Barronett, after Barron County. A post office called Barronett has been in operation since 1881.

References

Census-designated places in Barron County, Wisconsin
Census-designated places in Wisconsin